"Revelry" is the third single from Kings of Leon's fourth studio album Only by the Night, released on March 2, 2009. The single debuted in the UK Singles Chart at #55 via download sales alone on March 1, 2009, and peaked at #29 the following week. It dropped only two places to #31 during its second physical week. It has marked the band's ninth UK Top 40 single.

Track listing
 "Revelry" – 3:21
 "Pistol of Fire" (Mark Ronson Remix) – 3:17

Charts and certifications

Weekly charts

Certifications

References 

2008 songs
2009 singles
Songs written by Caleb Followill
Songs written by Nathan Followill
Songs written by Jared Followill
Songs written by Matthew Followill
Kings of Leon songs
RCA Records singles
Song recordings produced by Jacquire King